The Timoleague and Courtmacsherry Light Railway, Ireland, opened in April 1891, was originally operated by two locomotives, both from the Leeds works of the Hunslet Engine Company. The first of these was an 0-6-0ST named Slaney, built in 1885 it did not survive to the 1925 amalgamation, being scrapped five years previously.

The second locomotive was Hunslet No.520, built in 1890, an 0-4-2T named St. Molaga, which under the classification adopted by the Great Southern Railways on amalgamation in 1925 became the sole representative of Class L6.

This locomotive, along with a third Hunslet, Argadeen, passed to the GSR on amalgamation in 1925. It passed to Córas Iompair Éireann at the 1945 nationalisation and was withdrawn in 1949.

References 
 Records of the Hunslet Engine Company.
 

Steam locomotives of Ireland
5 ft 3 in gauge locomotives
0-4-2T locomotives
Hunslet locomotives
Individual locomotives of Ireland
Railway locomotives introduced in 1890
Scrapped locomotives